I Know is Norwegian singer Tone Damli's third studio album, which was released on 30 March 2009. It was produced by David Eriksen. The album peaked at number 3 on the Norwegian Albums Chart.

Track listing 
 "Still" – 3:16
 "Longshot" – 3:10
 "I Know" – 3:55
 "Here I am (You Got Me)" – 3:49
 "Butterflies" – 3:01
 "Sooner or Later" – 3:41
 "Parachute" – 3:54
 "Then Comes You" – 3:14
 "Crawl" – 3:42
 "Lets finish what we started" – 3:09
 "Little Lies" – 4:00
 "Butterflies" (Remix) – 3:10

Charts

Release history

References

2009 albums
Tone Damli albums